Jason Michael Bunyan (born 9 March 1979 in Milton Keynes) is a former England under-21 international motorcycle speedway rider from England. He is a ten times champion of New Zealand.

Racing career
He won the New Zealand Championship from 2004 to 2006, 2008 to 2010, 2012 to 2014 and 2016. The ten wins broke the previous record of nine wins held by Larry Ross.

Bunyan began his British leagues career when signing for Poole Pirates for the 1995 Premier League speedway season. After a season with Oxford Cheetahs he moved to join the Isle of Wight Islanders from 1997 to 1998. He spent three seasons with Ipswich Witches from 1999 to 2001 and two seasons with Coventry from 2003 to 2004 before turning his attention to New Zealand after every British season.

In 2007, he captained the Isle of Wight Islanders to the Premier League Fours Championship and partnered Chris Holder to the Premier League Pairs title.

For 2011 Bunyan signed with the Plymouth Devils before moving to Rye House Rockets in 2012. He remained with the Rockets until August 2014 when he was injured and subsequently retired after the season.

World Speedway Championship

Grand-Prix Appearances
 2012  Auckland (16th) 1pt
 2013  Auckland (16th) 1pt
 2014  Auckland (15th) 2pts

World Longtrack Championship

Grand-Prix Series
 1999 2 app (19th) 7pts

Personal life
Outside of speedway, Bunyan enjoys snowboarding and spends the winter in New Zealand.

References

British speedway riders
English motorcycle racers
Isle of Wight Islanders riders
Coventry Bees riders
Oxford Cheetahs riders
Poole Pirates riders
Reading Racers riders
Ipswich Witches riders
1979 births
Living people
Individual Speedway Long Track World Championship riders